Lukangol was a town in Jonglei, South Sudan that was destroyed during 2011 South Sudan clashes. Before its destruction it had a population of 20,000.

References

Former populated places in South Sudan
Jonglei State